Jeanne d'Arc Dijon Basket, commonly known as JDA Dijon Basket or simply Dijon, is a professional basketball club from the city of Dijon, France. The club currently plays in the LNB Pro A, the French first tier division. The club has won the French Federation Cup twice, in 1993 and 2006.

The club is named after Joan of Arc, a heroine in French history.

History

The club, named after Joan of Arc, was founded in 1880, as a sports club active in gymnastics, football, as well as cultural activities such as theatre.

In the 2003–04 season, JDA reached the finals of the FIBA EuroCup Challenge, the continent's fourth tier level. In its first European final ever, Dijon lost to German club Mitteldeutscher BC, by a score of 68–84.

Dijon played in the 2019–20 FIBA Champions League, marking its return to European-wide competitions for the first time since 2014. The team won the bronze medal after defeating Zaragoza in the third place game.

In the 2020–21 season, Dijon reached the Finals of the LNB Pro A for the first time in club history, after defeating Monaco in the semi-final. In the single-game Finals, Dijon lost to ASVEL.

Arena
JDA Dijon Basket plays its home games at the Palais des Sports Jean-Michel Geoffroy, which has a seating capacity of 5,000.

Honors and titles

Domestic competitions
LNB Pro A
Runners-up (1): 2020–21
French Federation Cup
Champions (2): 1993, 2006
French League Cup
Champions (1): 2020
French Supercup
Champions (1): 2006

European competitions
FIBA Champions League
Third place: 2019–20
FIBA EuroCup Challenge
Runner-up: 2003–04

Season by season

Players

Roster

Notable players

References

External links
Official website

Basketball teams in France
Sport in Dijon